William I de la Roche (died 1287) succeeded his brother, John I, as Duke of Athens in 1280. He was the son of Guy I de la Roche.

William reversed the territorial losses of his brother's reign, extending his control over Lamia and Gardiki. He married Helena Angelina Komnene, daughter of John I Doukas, ruler of Thessaly, securing a military alliance with him.

In 1285, while Charles II of Naples, nominal prince of Achaea, was imprisoned, Robert of Artois, regent of the kingdom, named William bailiff and vicar-general of Achaea. William built the castle of Dimatra to defend Messenia from the Byzantine Empire. He was then the most powerful baron in Frankish Greece. In 1286, he arbitrated the succession of the March of Bodonitsa following the death of Isabella Pallavicini. He chose her cousin Thomas over her widower Antoine le Flamenc.

William's rule was peaceful, but short, as he died two years after assuming power in Achaea (1287). He was succeeded by his son Guy, who was seven years old.

Notes

References
  

1287 deaths
Christians of the Crusades
Dukes of Athens
Year of birth unknown
Baillis of the Principality of Achaea
William 01
Lords of Argos and Nauplia
13th-century rulers in Europe
13th-century French nobility
13th-century people from the Principality of Achaea